New York's 53rd State Assembly district is one of the 150 districts in the New York State Assembly. It has been represented by Maritza Davila since 2013.

Geography
District 53 is in Brooklyn. It encompasses portions of Bushwick and East Williamsburg.

Recent election results

2022

2020

2018

2016

2014

2013 special

2012

2010

References 

Politics of Brooklyn
53